Terry KaJuan Mickens (born February 21, 1971, in Tallahassee, Florida) is a retired American football player, who was a wide receiver for the Green Bay Packers and the Oakland Raiders from 1994 to 1999. He played college football at Florida A&M University.

College career 
After being a fringe Division I-AA All-America candidate, starting quarterback woes plagued Mickens' final college season. He was coached by former Cincinnati Bengals cornerback Ken Riley and ran a 4.5 second 40-yard dash.

Professional career

Green Bay Packers 
Mickens was drafted by the Green Bay Packers in the fifth round (146th overall) of the 1994 NFL Draft. He appeared in twelve games and caught four passes his rookie season. He continued to see sparse playing time his sophomore year. In 1996, he was part of the Super Bowl XXXI winning Green Bay Packers team, seeing his best action as a Packer to date, with 18 catches for 161 yards. He only caught two passes due to a high ankle sprain in 1997, his last year with the Packers.

Oakland Raiders 
The Oakland Raiders signed Mickens in May 1998. His most productive season came in 1998, where he caught 24 passes for 346 yards and 1 touchdown. He earned playing time after beating out Desmond Howard, Olanda Truitt and Kenny Shedd for the No. 3 receiver position. In 1999, Mickens did not reach the end zone at all but still caught 20 passes. A neck injury before the 2000 season landed him on injured reserve for the entire season. He played in all 32 games he was healthy while he was in Oakland.

Post-career life 
In 2004, he began scouting for the Philadelphia Eagles. He has one son, Tyler.

External links
 Philadelphia Eagles bio
 Green Bay Packers bio

References 

1971 births
Living people
Players of American football from Tallahassee, Florida
American football wide receivers
Florida A&M Rattlers football players
Green Bay Packers players
Oakland Raiders players